Nationality words link to articles with information on the nation's poetry or literature (for instance, Irish or France).

Events
 About this year, the Sturm und Drang movement ended in German literature (including poetry) and music, which began in the late 1760s. The conventional translation is "Storm and Stress"; a more literal translation, however, might be "storm and urge", "storm and longing", "storm and drive" or "storm and impulse".
 Phillis Wheatley advertises in the September issue of The Boston Magazine for subscribers to a volume of poetry she proposes to publish, but the volume never appears, apparently for lack of support; United States

Works published

United Kingdom
 Anonymous, Rolliad
 Mary Alcock, The Air Balloon
 Thomas Chatterton, A Supplement to the Miscellanies of Thomas Chatterton, poetry and prose (see also, Miscellanies 1778), published posthumously (died 1770)
 Richard Jago, Poems, Moral and Descriptive
 Anna Seward, Louisa: A poetical novel
 Charlotte Turner Smith, Elegaic Sonnets, and Other Essays (see also Elegaic Sonnets 1797)
 Helen Maria Williams:
 An Ode on the Peace
 Peru

Other
 Évariste de Parny, Élégies, France

Births
Death years link to the corresponding "[year] in poetry" article:
 January 31 – Bernard Barton (died 1849), English Quaker poet
 June 17 – Andrew Crosse (died 1855), English 'gentleman scientist' and poet
 May 18 – William Tennant (died 1848), Scottish poet
 July 27 – Denis Davydov (died 1839), Russian soldier-poet of the Napoleonic Wars, inventor of a specific genre — hussar poetry noted for its hedonism and bravado
 October 19 – Leigh Hunt  (died 1859), English critic, essayist, poet and writer
 November 17 – Julia Nyberg (died  1854), Swedish poet and songwriter
 December 7 – Allan Cunningham (died 1842), Scottish poet and author

Deaths
Birth years link to the corresponding "[year] in poetry" article:

 January 17 – Yosa Buson 与謝蕪村 (born 1716), Japanese, Edo period poet and painter; along with Matsuo Bashō and Kobayashi Issa, considered among the greatest poets of the Edo Period and one of the greatest haiku poets of all time (surname: Yosa)
 February 2 – Henry Alline (born 1748), American-born Canadian preacher and hymn-writer
 February 14 – Charlotta Löfgren (born 1720), Swedish poet
 March 17 – Anne Penny (born 1729), Welsh-born poet
 May 20 – Alexander Ross (born 1699), Scottish poet
 November 1 – Jean-Jacques Lefranc, Marquis de Pompignan (born 1709), French man of letters
 December 5 – Phillis Wheatley (born 1753), American poet, died in poverty while working on a second book of poetry, subsequently lost
 December 13 – Dr. Samuel Johnson (born 1709), English writer, poet, lexicographer, editor and literary critic
 Lê Quý Đôn (born 1726), Vietnamese, philosopher, poet, encyclopedist and government official

See also

 List of years in poetry
 List of years in literature
 18th century in poetry
 18th century in literature
 18th-century French literature
 List of years in poetry
 Poetry

Notes

18th-century poetry
Poetry